Humoreska is a 1939 Czechoslovak drama film directed by Otakar Vávra.

Cast
 Rudolf Hrušínský as Young Josef Hupka
 Vladimír Salač as Teenage Hynek
 Jaroslav Průcha as Middle-aged Josef Hupka
 Ladislav Boháč as Adult Hynek

References

External links
 

1939 films
1939 drama films
1930s Czech-language films
Czechoslovak black-and-white films
Films directed by Otakar Vávra
Czechoslovak drama films
1930s Czech films